Life Lessons may refer to:
 "Life Lessons" (Danny Phantom), a 2005 episode of the animated television series Danny Phantom
 Life Lessons (New York Stories), a segment of the 1989 anthology film New York Stories
 Life Lessons: A Series of Practical Lessons of Life, from Life, and about Life, a book by Grace Mann Brown